Markéta Bednářová (née Mokrošová, born 17 April 1981 in Nové Město na Moravě) is a Czech basketball player who competed in the 2008 Summer Olympics.

References

1981 births
Living people
Czech women's basketball players
Olympic basketball players of the Czech Republic
Basketball players at the 2008 Summer Olympics
People from Nové Město na Moravě
Sportspeople from the Vysočina Region